Om is a 2003 Indian bollywood action film directed and produced by Ashoka Honda. It stars then-newcomer Attin Bhalla with Sandali Sinha, Pankaj Dheer and Sharat Saxena.

Cast 
 Attin Bhalla as Om
 Sandali Sinha as Sandali
 Pankaj Dheer as Mr. Dhariwal
 Rakhi Sawant as Celina
 Sharat Saxena
 Mukesh Rishi
 Smita Jaykar as Om's mother

Plot
Om has been banished from Mumbai for a period of 2 years.  Shortly after the beginning of these two years, Mr. Dhariwal goes to Om's mother and begs that she call Om back to Mumbai.  The reason he needs Om is because his daughter Sandali has been kidnapped by Ghotia Bhai, Dhariwal's associate. Ghotia Bhai wishes for Sandali to marry his son, Brandy. However, Dhariwal and Sandali do not want this so Om comes back to rescue the girl he cares for.

When Om arrives in the city, he is able to free Sandali and disposes of Brandy in the process.  Inspector Nasir Pathan is the new chief of police in the district and since Om is not supposed to be back for 2 years, pursues him.  He catches Om, arrests and puts him into jail and returns Sandali to her father.  Upon further investigation though, Nasir Pathan uncovers an evil conspiracy against Om and his family.  Not only had Om been unfairly banished for 2 years, his sister had also been murdered by Inspector Katkar.

Om and Sandali had fallen in love when they met a few months before.  However, Mr. Dhariwal didn't want this marriage because in his wife's will, the boy that Sandali marries will get her wealth and Dhariwal would be left penniless.  The reason she had stipulated this is because she did not trust her husband's ability to control his gambling and habit of vice.  Dhariwal murdered his wife but no one found out.  So he waited for years until Sandali grew up and he started looking for a boy he could manipulate into giving him half of his daughter's endowment.  He asks Om to share the money with him upon his marriage to Sandali but the former refuses.  This alarms Dhariwal so he turns to Inspector Katkar and along with Dhariwal's new wife, the cunning Celina, they both hatch an evil plan to ruin Om's name in the city, thereby making it difficult for Sandali to marry him.

Katkar arranges for Darren, Celina's secret paramour, to go to Om's house and act as if his younger sister was a prostitute and Darren was frequenting the house for this purpose.  Om's sister is taken to jail and killed but Katkar disguises it as a suicide.  Om gets to know of their plan to ruin his family's name (but not his sister's murder) and confronts Dhariwal, Darren and Katkar.  Because he attacks Katkar, the inspector is able to exile Om for 2 years from Mumbai as a dangerous criminal.

When Sandali is returned to her father after Om rescues her, he is furious to find out that Om and she have consummated their marriage by exchanging vows.  He quickly ignores this and wants her to marry Darren.  However, before this can happen Celina divulges that Darren is her secret lover and she was simply using Dhariwal for his money.  Dhariwal is incensed and shot to death by Celina with no remorse.  Darren then disposes of Celina and prepares to marry Sandali so he can control all her wealth.

Om breaks out of jail where, after a thorough investigation, Inspector Nasir Pathan has just realised the truth about the conspiracy against him.  Om also finds out that Katkar had killed his sister and confronts him.  After a furious struggle, Om kills him.  He then sets off to rescue Sandali from Darren, with Inspector Pathan in hot pursuit as well.  Darren and Om have a long and intense fight but Om perseveres.  He and Sandali then set off to marry, with Inspector Pathan watching and knowing that Om has been vindicated.

Music

External links
 
 A humorous take on the movie

References

2000s Hindi-language films
2003 films
Films scored by Amar Mohile
Indian action drama films